Misogyny in rap music refers to lyrics, videos, or other aspects of rap music that support, glorify, justify, or normalize the objectification, exploitation, or victimization of women. It is an ideology that portrays women as objects for men's ownership, use, or abuse. It diminishes women to expendable beings. It can range from innuendoes to stereotypical characterizations and defamations.

Scholars have proposed various explanations for the presence of misogyny in rap music. Some have argued that rap artists use misogynistic lyrics and portrayals of women as a way to assert their masculinity or to demonstrate their authenticity as rappers. Others have suggested that rap music is a product of its environment, reflecting mainstream attitudes toward women, and that rap artists have internalized negative stereotypes about women. Still other academics have stressed economic considerations, arguing that rappers use misogyny to achieve commercial success.

Content analyses have found that approximately 22% to 37% of rap lyrics contain some misogyny, depending on subgenre. Adams and Fuller state that there are six themes that are considered to be misogynistic rap: derogatory statements about women relative to sex; comments linking malicious actions against women, also in relation to sex; referencing women causing problems for men; the characterization of women as "users" of men; references to women being less than men and finally lyrics referencing ideas that women are usable and discardable beings. Detroit-based rapper Eminem, for example, used misogyny in eleven of the 14 songs on his third studio album The Marshall Mathers LP (2000). Common misogynistic themes include the use of derogatory names such as "bitch" and "ho(e)" (derived from whore), sexual objectification of women, legitimization of violence against women, distrust of women, the belittling of sex workers and glorification of pimping.

Mia Moody-Ramirez writes that, "Most female artists define independence by mentioning elements of financial stability and sexuality. They denote that they are in control of their bodies and sexuality. Many male rappers pit the independent woman against the gold digger or rider narrative when they preach independence in their lyrics. Bynoe (2010) noted that in the hip-hop world, women are rarely the leader. Instead, they are usually depicted as riders, or women who are sexually and visually appealing and amenable to their mate's infidelities. Conversely, a gold digger uses her physical attributes to manipulate men and to take their money."

Responses to misogyny in hip hop music have ranged from criticism by women's rights activists, student protests and organized campaigns to a 2007 congressional hearing. Female rap artists have used their music or started organizations to explicitly oppose hip hop misogyny, and have expressed resistance by using self-empowering lyrics and emphasizing their independence as women. Female rappers accounted for only 5 of the 90 misogynistic songs, as well as an additional 8 songs (out of the remaining 313) that did not have misogynistic lyrics. The scarcity of female artists shows just how male- dominated rap was during this time, especially at the platinum level". However, not all female rap artists resist misogynistic portrayals.

Degradation of African-American women 
Many commentators believe that African American women suffer from high levels of stereotyping and the resultant discrimination and have done stretching back as far as the end of slavery. Some argue this leads to the misogynistic claims against African American women to be more rationalized or go unnoticed. The portrayal of African American women in rap music videos is done respect to hegemonic controlling images. This form of discrimination is known as “misogynoir,” a term used by Black feminist Patricia Hill Collins  that is linked to the anti-Black racism and sexism towards Black women in visual and digital culture in the US. This term was coined by Moya Bailey in 2008.  In a study of the images of African American women in rap music videos, three stereotypes were revealed: Jezebel, Sapphire, and Mami/Baby Mama". In an analysis of 38 rap music videos, Emerson noticed that videos have the ideological controlling image of the hypersexual "jezebel" as well images of agency, independence, strength, and autonomy. Emerson also points out that the videos often feature reversals of the traditional focus on female bodies from the male gaze. Instead, he notes that the videos have in common "the construction of the male body, and particularly the black male body, as the object of Black female pleasure".

"Based on these three stereotypes, the videos present African American women as greedy, dishonest, sex objects, with no respect for themselves or others, including the children under their care. The women in the videos are scorned by men and exist to bring pleasure to them." In the genre of "gangsta rap", women but more specifically African American women, are lessened to mere objects, with their only purpose being good for sex as well as abuse, and at the end of the day are a burden to men.

Misogynistic descriptions of black women in rap music is predominately dominated by their black male counterparts which might actually reflect a real problem between the tensions of gender relationships within African American communities. In Dennis Herds article, Rose (2008) states, "Sexism is visible, vulgar, aggressive and popular, fueled by a complex of factors including sexism in black communities that influence rappers' attitudes and lyrics as well as the patriarchal values permeating the wider society".

Rationale

Street authenticity
Mainstream hip hop music authenticates homophobia and sexism in order to celebrate images of violence. Rappers create explicit, violent lyrics against women to assert dominance over them and prove their authenticity as gangsters. Public speculation suggests that rappers fear being considered "soft" and "fake"; therefore, rappers associate themselves with hypermasculine self-portrayals and hostile representations of women. The willingness to socially oppress women becomes a way for hip hop/rap artists to assert their masculinity. Meanwhile, male artists battle constantly with W.E.B. Du Bois' idea of double consciousness.

Hyper-masculinity is one of the primary deriving sources of hip-hop male artists using misogyny in their songs. For example, in Tyler The Creator's song "She", Frank Ocean sings in the perspective of a man watching a woman as she sleeps and stays in her room, and continues to stalk and lust over her. His lyrics state "Now she tryna patch me up but, girl I was just tryna get a nut bust" This describes how even though the woman is attempting to discuss their problems or conflict with each other he is only interested in having sex with her, objectifying her in the process. Throughout the song he also sings the lyrics "Blinds wide open so he can see you in the dark when you sleepin".

This is a direct example of hyper-masculinity as he exaggerates his sexual desire for this woman. Further towards the song, the lyric that stands out the most is "One, two; you're the girl that I want, three, four , five, six, seven; shit eight is the bullets if you say no after all this...I just wanna drag your lifeless body to the forest, and fornicate with it but that's because I'm in love with you, cunt". Tyler is quite literally stating he would continue to advance onto the woman even after she says no and does not consent. Lyrics like these spread the wrong message about sexual assault and add to the "perpetuation of rape culture and rape myth acceptance"

Because of the song's catchy melody, people tend not to realize just how odd and unusual this sort of aggressiveness really is. But at the same time, due to modern pop culture this kind of "aggressive attitude towards American society has been codified as being a "natural" attitude of all black males in society". Rap music promotes and reflects "rape culture" that 'is a complex of beliefs supporting a continuum of threatened violence against women that ranges from sexual remarks to rape itself". In other words, Armstrong states that "gangsta rap" might actually be a true cultural statement about the rappers and their life experiences, and in turn refutes any type of structurally oriented explanation.

Academic Elijah Anderson links the treatment of women in hip hop culture with troubled gender relations in inner-city Black and Latino communities. In an ethnographic study of inner-city Philadelphia neighborhoods, Anderson found that young men in Black/Latino neighborhoods attempt to raise their social status and self-esteem by demeaning and exploiting women. Anderson writes that "[in] many cases the more the young man seems to exploit the young woman, the higher is his regard within the peer group."

Hip-Hop National Language 

The language used in hip-hop is highly gendered. Artists and listeners of all genders are often forced to participate in hip-hop through strict systems of heterosexual-centered power. Privileging the Black male experience within this framework is what constructs the Hip-Hop National Language (HHNL). The specific gender tropes that are used to justify sexual oppression take place within HHNL. These specific tropes of race and racial oppression combined with those specific tropes of gender is the process that allows HHNL to remain hetero-masculine at the expense of the Black women and/or Black queer rappers, especially those who attempt to use it.

Many songs and lyrics by Black male artists reveal the deeply seated hetero-masculinity within hip-hop that needs to be dismantled for Black women and/or queer artists to truly be able to use HHNL to create narratives that are separate from heterosexual male pleasure and assert their control. Artists like Missy Elliott and Queen Latifah to Megan Thee Stallion and Noname can break into this ability. "Their purposeful use of alternative HHNL to make statements about self and body, as well as Black female subjectivity and womanhood more broadly, are statements that few women could ever do publicly".

Commercial incentives
Another rationale for the use of misogyny in hip hop music is that it has helped rappers gain commercial success. While hip hop began as a producer based art form among the working class and poor African American and Puerto Rican youth, its transformation into a global consumer product has influenced even its treatment of women. During the 1990s record executives began to urge hip hop artists to write more violent and offensive lyrics at the demand of hip hop audiences. Margaret Hunter (2011) suggests that in this period the commercialization of Hip Hop for largely white audiences became linked to the overwhelming objectification of women of color in rap lyrics and videos.

In describing the predominance of images of women of color, specifically in the ever-present strip-club scenes in modern hip hop music videos, Hunter states that, "because these sexual transactions are also racial, part of their appeal to buying audiences is the reinforcement of dominant narratives about African American and Latina women, and the concomitant symbolic protection of white femininity by its absence in representations." However, some feel that, "the misogyny has always been there". Serena Kim, features editor for Vibe magazine states, "but it's different now because the culture is bigger and mainstream. Now every kid in America is well-versed in hip hop."

Channeling of wider cultural misogyny
Many scholars have argued that misogyny in hip-hop culture is a product of misogyny within American culture at large. Adams and Fuller (2006) suggest that hip hop artists have internalized negative stereotypes about women that are prevalent in American society, after witnessing women being treated poorly growing up. Michael Eric Dyson states that misogyny is a tried-and-true American tradition from which hip hop derives its understanding of how men and women should behave. Similarly, Charlise Cheney argues that hip-hop's misogyny and promotion of traditional gender roles reflect mainstream American values.

Jeff Chang and David Zirkin contend that the misogyny extant in American popular culture provides "incentives for young men of color to act out a hard-core masculinity". Kate Burns argues, in the same vein, that the discourse of hip hop culture is shaped by its environment, stating that rather than asking, "what is rap's influence on American society and culture?" critics should ask, "what has been society's role in shaping and influencing hip hop?"

Feminist bell hooks suggests that misogyny in hip-hop culture is not a "male black thing" but has its roots in a larger pattern of hostility toward women in American culture. She cautions against singling out criticism against rap music while accepting and perpetuating less raw and vulgar expressions of misogyny that permeate American society. She writes that it is "much easier to attack gangsta rap than to confront the culture that produces [the] need [for gangsta rap]." Others have reiterated this concern, arguing hip hop's content is no more misogynistic than other forms of popular discourse. Academic Leola Johnson, for instance, asserts: The misogynist lyrics of gangsta rap are hateful indeed, but they do not represent a new trend in Black popular culture, nor do they differ fundamentally from woman hating discourses that are common among White men. The danger of this insight is that it might be read as an apology for Black misogyny.

Another study states: 
Of particular importance are those aspects of the music that frequently appear in the midst of political debates and media hype. Often, these aspects are scrutinized not with the intent of acquiring more excellent and more nuanced understandings of the art form, but rather to further one political agenda or produce a nice sound bite. The misogyny in rap music is one such case.

Themes
Ronald Weitzer and Charis E. Kubrin (2009) have identified five common misogynistic themes in rap lyrics: (a) derogatory naming and shaming of women, (b) sexual objectification of women, (c) legitimization of violence against women, (d) distrust of women, and (e) celebration of prostitution and pimping. Sexual objectification is the most common misogynistic theme in rap music according to Weitzer and Kubrin, whose 2009 analysis found that 67% of the examined rap lyrics sexually objectified women.

In misogynistic songs, women are described using derogatory names such as "bitches", "hoes", or "chickenheads". These insults seek to degrade them and keep them "in their place". Meanwhile, men are praised for abusing and exploiting women. One example of this can be found in videos in which hip-hop artists lounge poolside as a harem of women gyrate around them in bikinis.  Women of color, specifically black women, are more likely to be featured as sexual objects in such videos than white women.

Partner violence in hip hop 

Misogynistic rap often depicts physical violence and rape as appropriate responses to women who challenge male domination, refuse sexual advances, or simply "offend" men. This dynamic is exemplified by Juvenile in his song March Nigga Step where he raps, "If she thinks you're jokin', is she goin' get a quick chokin'?". Popular rap artists such as Eminem and Odd Future have also been criticized for their depictions of violence against women.

A related sub-theme involves boasting about sex acts that harm or are painful for women. Many misogynistic rap songs also portray women as untrustworthy or unworthy of respect. Women are depicted as femmes fatales, "gold diggers", and as dishonest about sexual matters. Tupac Shakur (Hell 4 A Hustler) asks, "Why plant seeds in a dirty bitch, waitin' to trick me? Not the life for me". At the same time pimps are glorified; their ability to control and exploit women is praised.

The genre of rap music originates from the era of slavery and was born out of traditional slave spirituals such as the blues, jazz, and soul as a way for African Americans to fight oppression through music. The genres of the blues, jazz and soul transformed over time with the help of African American youths into one of the most popular genres of music referred to as rap music, which, unlike the traditional slave spirituals, rap music contains elements of promoting violence, sex, and materialism. When rappers portray these messages of violence, sex and materialism according to Conrad, Dixon, and Zhang "researchers suggest that these messages propagate a desire for wealth, while glamorizing sexual actions and violence as a means to obtain this affluence".

However, within the genre of rap music, there is "gangsta rap", which portrays a different kind of message. According to Conrad, Dixon, Zhang a content analysis done by Kubrun (2005), established that 68% of "gangsta rap" main message is respect and is portrayed just as often as the message of violence within rap music. By displaying such a powerful message like respect, helps show that rap music can be used positively by the African American community to reinforce social movement.

Prevalence

Overt misogyny in rap music emerged in the late 1980s, and has since then been a feature of the music of numerous hip hop artists. A 2005 content analysis of six outlets of media found that music contained substantially more sexual content than any other media outlets. A survey of adolescents showed that 66% of black girls and 57% of black boys believe that rap music videos portray black women in "bad and offensive ways". Gangsta rap, the most commercially successful sub genre of hip hop, has been particularly criticized and associated with misogyny.

Hip hop that harbors misogyny is conveyed to the public through various forms and modes. Whether it be shown through: records, radio, videos and many other forms allows misogynistic hip hop to be readily available to the public.

In a 2001 content analysis of gangsta rap, sociologists Charis E. Kubrin and Ronald Weitzer claimed that approximately 22% of the examined rap lyrics featured violence against women, including depictions of assault, murder and rape. In their opinion, the prevalence of misogynistic themes in songs were as follows: name-calling and shame account for 49%, sexual objectification accounts for 67%, distrust of women at 47%, acts of violence against women account for 18%, and human trafficking account for 20%. By contrast, in a similar study by sociologist Edward G. Armstrong, Eminem scored 78% for violent misogyny. Of the eighteen songs on his 2000 album The Marshall Mathers LP, eleven contain violent and misogynistic lyrics, nine of which referred to killing women.

In 2003, McFarland conducted an analysis of Chicano rap and found that Chicano rappers depict women as sex objects, morally and intellectually inferior, and objects of violence. 37% of Chicano rap songs depicted women as sex objects and 4% mentioned violence against women. Except for the "good mother" figure, all other women that were mentioned in the sample were portrayed negatively. Moreover, Chicano rappers who discussed sex and sexuality almost always depicted women as objects of domination for men.

Conrad, Dixon and Zhang (2009) investigated rap music videos and noted that there has been a shift from violent portrayals to more sexual misogynistic ones. Women in rap videos are placed in positions of objectification and sexual submission to their male counterparts. The researchers argue that this "suggests that there are important gender differences occurring that prefer men over women".

Subordination of women is not unique to the genre of hip hop. According to Weitzer and Kubrin's 2009 analysis, 22% of rap songs surveyed in their study contained misogynistic lyrics. This means that misogyny is less pervasive in rap music than some critics believe, although is clearly a significant theme. The researchers noted that according to some studies, women are presented as subordinate to men in a majority of rock and country music videos. The analysis also indicates that rap's misogynistic messages are rather extreme. Rap stands out for the intensity and graphic nature of its lyrical objectification, exploitation, and victimization of women. Other genres, in the aggregate, make more subtle allusions to gender inequality or present more muted criticisms of women.

Rapper Tim'm West says it's time to start asking questions about rap and hip-hop, "we need to begin to ask why we bought into this industry that overwhelmingly places emphasis and resources and capital on people who promote images that are seen as negative and that do promote stereotypes as opposed to the more positive images", West says.

Impact
Experimental research has attempted to measure the effects of exposure to rap music. Numerous studies have found a correlation between consumption of misogynistic hip hop music and negative beliefs about women. Webster et al. found that men who listened to sexually violent gangsta rap lyrics were significantly more likely than controls to express "adversarial sexual beliefs", like the belief that men should dominate women. However, they noted that gangsta rap did not influence men's other attitudes toward women.

Other studies showed that rap videos which contain images of women in sexually subordinate roles increase female subjects' acceptance of violence against women, and that listening to misogynistic hip hop increases sexually aggressive behavior in men.  Women and men are more likely to accept sexist and demeaning messages about gender relations after listening to music with sexually degrading music. However, college students who listen to this music are even more likely to say that they find these lyrics to be accurate and acceptable portrayals of romantic and sexual relationships.

The art of hip hop has seen immense success all around the world and influences many. It has the power to affect the economy, social trends as well as the media. Hip hop that contains misogyny can and has changed the way women are treated in society. The way women are recognized in misogynistic hip hop songs or videos can easily be translated into society.

Not only are women objectified and abused in lyrics to sexually explicit music, but the music also portrays the women as being lesser than men. According to the textbook Women: Images and Realities, this music sends the message to young adults, especially Black youth that their enemy is Black girls and women, since the music portrays women as selfish, untrustworthy, and as subordinate.

A 2007 study by Michael Cobb and William Boettcher found that exposure to rap music increases sexist attitudes toward women. Men who listened to rap music held more sexist beliefs than the control group. Women were also more likely to support sexism when rap music was not overtly misogynistic. However, they were less likely to hold sexist beliefs when the lyrics were very misogynistic. Rudman and Lee found that exposure to violent and misogynistic rap music strengthens the association between black men and negative attributes. People who are exposed to violent and misogynistic rap music are more likely to perceive black men as hostile and sexist.

Academics Johnnetta B. Cole and Beverly Guy-Sheftall, for instance, have expressed concern over the effects of misogyny in hip hop culture on children, stating, "We are concerned because we believe that hip-hop is more misogynist and disrespectful of Black girls and women than other popular music genres. The casual references to rape and other forms of violence and the soft-porn visuals and messages of many rap music videos are seared into the consciousness of young Black boys and girls at an early age."

A longitudinal study indicated that young people who regularly listen to sexually degrading lyrics are more likely to have sex at an earlier age while exposure to non-degrading sexual content had no effect. Sexually degrading lyrics were found to be most common in rap music. The survey also suggests that repeated exposure to sexually degrading lyrics may lead girls to expect that they will be treated with disrespect by their partners and that they have to take a submissive role.

In a 2011 study, Gourdine and Lemmons identified age and listening habits as key factors which determine the perception and impact of misogyny in hip hop music. They examined students aged 18 to 24 years and found that the older the participants were, the less they listened to rap music and that they reacted more negatively to misogynistic lyrics.

Along with the major studies conducted, misogyny in rap music creates a different mindset among people. For example, children who grow up listening to misogynistic music may grow into feeling comfortable with talking to women in a manner that affects the way they might treat women in the future. Although this may not always be the case, listening to this type of music regularly gives people a mindset that gives them "permission" to speak to women this way.

In studies performed to assess the reactions of young males exposed to violent or sexist rap or music videos, participants reported an increased likelihood that they would engage in violence, a greater acceptance of violence, and a greater acceptance of violence against women than did those who were not exposed to these videos.

In a study researching the effects on female listeners, Ellen S. Nikodym found that in comparing the impact of an objectifying song to a neutral song there was "no significant differences between the two groups on measures of body shame, body surveillance, and depressive symptoms. There were significant differences between the two groups in terms of self-objectification, with those listening to the objectifying song reporting higher levels of self-objectification as shown by more statements that in some way said, "I am my body.""

Overlooking misogyny
Many artists that have sexist lyrics that degrade women often have important messages that become tarnished from their use of misogyny. Julius Bailey identified Kanye West as being "at the forefront of a sexist regime, disguised as black liberation in form of art". While Kanye acknowledges that black males are victims of racial discriminatory policies he ignores the effect on black women. Kanye "engages in the process of sublimation vis-a-vis the sexual violation of white women, in order to mitigate his frustration regarding a system that abets the invisibility and exploitation of black males.

Bailey continues by saying that we have to question Kanye's sincerity of his messages when he raps at the end of "New Slaves" about threatening to sexually violate the wives of private corporations' owners, by forcing them into intercourse, and by ejaculating semen inside of their mouths and on their clothing. Bailey says that Kanye has to realize that inflicting oppression upon another group of human beings does not mean he is liberated.

In an interview posted on YouTube in 2010, artist Nelly is interviewed by Vlad Tv on his thoughts of the infamous "credit card swipe" in his music video for the song "Tip Drill". This music video was at the forefront of protest because of its misogyny and exploitation of women and their bodies, especially by the women of Spelman College. According to Mark Anthony Neal, a professor of American Studies at the University of Texas at Austin a "tip drill" is "a ghetto colloquialism for the proverbial ugly girl with a nice body", In the video, Nelly states, "What did I do wrong?" He continues, "how do I degrade a female that suggested that I do it?"

Lil Wayne is also seen to be doing some good even though misogyny is present in his lyrics. Benjamin Moore Dupriest said that Lil Wayne, "engages with Rebaka's "idyllic impulse" of resistance, restitution, transcendence and opposition in discursive ways, despite the controversial subject matter of his lyrics and the representational implications his visual images." He also discusses how Lil Wayne's music is a "musical aesthetic that is more directed towards partying than poeticizing socio-political phenomena. His music achieves a certain level of consciousness through the expression of the challenges of black life in the city."

Many female rappers such as Missy Elliott, and Eve include lyrics and themes that condone misogyny. Matthew Oware states in "A 'Man's Woman?' Contradictory Messages in the Songs of Female Rappers, 1992-2000" that even though rap provides an outlet for those that are marginalized and/or oppressed such as women, there are very "high numbers of female self-objectification, self-exploitation, and derogatory and demeaning lyrics about women in general".

This is often overlooked by the fact that being it is said by a woman, it is already empowering them by giving a voice. However, this contradicts and works backwards in the effort of empowering women and female rappers. Oware states that "these contradictory lyrics nullify the positive messages that are conveyed by female rap artists, consequently reproducing and upholding hegemonic, sexist notions of femininity, and serving to undermine and disempower women".

Matthew Oware draws from a study as an example that compares the lyrics of first-wave rappers such as Queen Latifah and MC Lyte to second-wave rappers such as Lil' Kim and Foxy Brown. The sample includes 44 songs between 1992 and 2000 on certain female artists that specifically focus on their lyrics that illustrate female empowerment. What was found was the use of braggadocio as a theme, the emphasis on being attractive, desirable, and having a need for expensive material objects. "This type and degree of arrogance reverberates throughout rap music and is not unique to men or women; rather it illustrates artists' abilities, in their narratives, to overcome obstacles and eventually achieve success, albeit, material success."

Response

In 2001, "Hip-Hop Minister", and former Nation of Islam Minister, Conrad Tillard feuded with Def Jam Recordings co-founder Russell Simmons, accusing him of stoking violence by allowing the frequent use of words such as "nigga" and "bitch" in rap lyrics. Tillard then organized a summit in Harlem over what he viewed as negative imagery in hip hop. Simmons organized a counter-summit, urging the public not to "support open and aggressive critics of the hip-hop community".

In 2004, students at Spelman College protested rapper Nelly's music video "Tip Drill" and misogyny in rap music in general. The students criticized the negative portrayal and sexual objectification of African American women in the video, which showed women in bikinis dancing and simulating various sexual acts, men throwing money at women's genitals, and Nelly swiping a credit card through a woman's buttocks. Building on the momentum generated by the Spelman College protests, Essence magazine launched a twelve-month campaign entitled "Take Back the Music" to combat misogyny in hip hop culture. However, the protests and subsequent campaign received little media coverage.

A congressional hearing was held on September 25, 2007, to examine misogyny and racism in hip hop culture. The title of the hearing, "From Imus to Industry: The business of stereotypes and degrading images", referenced radio host Don Imus who called the Rutgers University women's basketball team "nappy-headed hos" and later blamed his choice of words on hip hop. Rappers "demean and defame black women", Imus claimed, and call them "worse names than I ever did." The hearing seemed to have no impact and was largely ignored by the press.

However, not all accusations of misogyny in hip hop have been taken seriously. In the case of Eminem's violence towards women, a poll run by Teen magazine illustrated that 74% of teenage girls would date Eminem if given the chance, despite his violence towards women in his music. In addition women listeners of T.O.'s pop hits radio station KISS 92 spoke about his music saying: "If you don't like it, turn it off," and "it's just fun and entertainment." This illustrates the fact that opinions differ among female audiences.

Included in the list of prominent figures who have taken a stance on the subject, African-American scholar Lerone Bennett Jr stated that, "We ... need a new understanding—in the media, in the entertainment industry, in our churches, schools, and organizations—that popular songs are as important as civil rights bills and that a society who pays pipers to corrupt its young and to defame its women and mothers will soon discover that it has no civil rights to defend and no songs to sing."

Female hip hop artists

Hip hop is a traditionally male-dominated genre in which critics argue authenticity has frequently been identified with masculinity. This creates one of many barriers that female artists typically face when entering the hip hop world, leading to some experiencing hostility towards them for their sex and marginalization. Hostility over their sex was largely unreciprocated until the recent adoption of personas of independent women and use of their sexuality as a form of sexual liberation by performers such as Lauryn Hill, Erykah Badu, Missy Elliott, Eve, Beyoncé, and Mary J. Blige.

Some critics such as Danyell Smith have claimed that in order to succeed, female performers have to fulfill an overly sexualized or masculine image in order to be marketable in hip-hop, as many executives, producers, and listeners appear to prefer men's versions of reality. Feminist Robin Roberts has argued that artists like Nicki Minaj make easy targets for misogyny due to songs such as "Stupid Hoe", while other critics have referenced artists like Lil' Kim, Mia X, and Trina, who often refer to themselves and other women as "bitches", "hoes", and "gold diggers".

Musicians who present a masculine persona like Young M.A. will often perform songs along the lines of "Ooouuu" that place her in the male role with the lyrics "I don't open doors for a whore / I just want the neck, nothin' more" and "I ride for my guys, that's the bro code."  A 2011 content analysis of music videos found that sexual objectification of women occurs not only in the music videos of male artists, but also female artists. Female rappers and R&B artists were found to particularly self-objectify, a finding consistent with objectification theory.

American academic Tricia Rose has argued that female rappers, most of whom are black, may find it difficult to condemn the misogyny of male rappers out of a need to collectively oppose racism and a desire to not contribute to the stereotype that black masculinity is "pathological". Rebollo-Gil and Moras have further contended a failure by black female rappers fail to provide a blanket defense of both rap music and the genre's misogyny is often "interpreted as treason by their black male counterparts and could possibly harm their career".

The media outlet Feministing has argued that the artists Nicki Minaj, Young M.A., and others like them are victims of an industry that makes millions off of disrespecting and objectifying women. Author Cheryl L. Keyes has suggested that women in the industry rarely get the opportunity to express empowering messages because in order to enter into rap and hip hop as performers and to compete with male rappers they must follow what Keyes calls "male rules". Female rap and hip hop artists must, according to Keyes, embody the male aesthetic and emulate male behavior in order to gain the attention of predominantly male record producers. Similarly, sociologist Patricia Hill Collins has argued that female performers must follow certain rules and even objectify themselves in order to be "accepted within this Black male-controlled universe."

In their book Gender Talk Johnnetta Cole and Beverly Guy-Sheftall have suggested that the objectification of African American women could potentially have historical roots in that historically African American women's bodies were "used as a breeding ground for the reproduction of a slave population" and were also used as a means of pleasure to white slave owners. They offer that African American women have always been a very vulnerable part of society, and that it is being reflected in gangsta rap music.

Male hip hop artists
Many male rappers, especially those labeled as political hip hop artists, have condemned misogyny in hip hop. In "Assata's Song" from his 1992 album Sleeping with the Enemy, the artist Paris criticizes misogyny, rapping about how women deserve respect. A music video for the song was released on the YouTube channel of Paris's label Guerrilla Funk Records.

Immortal Technique has also condemned sexism numerous times. The track "Crossing the Boundary," from his 2003 album Revolutionary Vol. 2, begin with the line, "I never make songs that disrespect women".
In 2010, at the Rock the Bells hip-hop festival in New York he condemned misogyny on stage by stating: "Your mother, your sister, your grandmother, the girl you came here with tonight, or the woman you're going to marry some day, she might have lost her virginity by being a victim of rape ... and she might never tell you. You poor bastards might never know, and it's because women are prouder than men, and every time we've been made slaves, it's only with the help of our women that we have risen up and fought oppression of every single kind." The same year, Canadian rapper Shad released the song "Keep Shining" where he talks about the positive influence women have had on his life and the need for hip-hop to have more female MCs.

British hip hop artists Lowkey and Akala have consistently avoided misogynistic lyrics from their music and chosen to sing about female empowerment instead; with Lowkey rapping, "So think about that stuff when you diss her; That's somebody's daughter, somebody's mother and somebody's sister" in the song Something Wonderful; and Akala rapping, "And I ain't diss black women to make my livin'" in Fire in the Booth Part IV.

Horrorcore rapper Necro has made songs and videos ridiculing and satirizing misogyny in hip hop, which can be seen as taking a stand against such behavior.

Other rappers, such as Tupac, leave a complex legacy, sometimes playing into misogynistic themes, yet also producing music that affirms the worth of black women, in songs such as "Keep Ya Head Up" and "Dear Mama".

Political hip hop is a subgenre of hip hop music that was developed in the 1980s as a way of turning rap music into a call for action and a form of social activism.

Although many male hip hop artists participate in misogyny in their music, they may not always be responsible for how women are portrayed. Many up and coming male hip hop artists have little authority in the hip hop industry or "game". Much of the hip-hop industry is controlled and influenced by corporations, many of which are controlled by white men. Therefore, the way black woman are conveyed in hip hop is widely influenced by white supervised corporations rather than hip hop artists alone.

Effects of misogynistic music in daily life
In the study, "Implicit and Explicit Consequences of Exposure to Violent and Misogynous Rap Music", researchers Rudman and Lee explored the consequences of rap music on everyday life and how it affected individuals thoughts and actions in regards to black people. The researchers begin by stating information conducted by previous research that explained, "subjects exposed to violent rap music were less likely to hire a Black applicant for a job that required intelligence (whereas a White applicant was not discriminated against), suggesting that priming one aspect of the Black stereotype (violent) increases the accessibility of related stereotypic traits" (unintelligent; Macrae, Stangor, & Milne, 1994). With this previous research, Rudman and Lee wanted to provide information on how our actions are primed because of hostile rap music.

They did so by exposing their subjects to either rap or popular mainstream music and then provided them with a questionnaire that assessed how they explicitly and implicitly viewed Black men. The researchers hypothesized that, "Because we predicted that violent and misogynistic rap music would temporarily activate associations between Black men and negative attributes (e.g. hostile, violent, sexist), while simultaneously deactivating associations between Black men and positive attributes (e.g. calm, lawful, trustworthy) we used these attributes in our stereotype IAT" (Rudman, Lee). Rudman and Lee then completed an experiment on 30 men that "tested the assumption that violent and misogynistic rap music would activate automatic Black stereotypes in high and low prejudiced subjects alike (Devine, 1989). Subjects were exposed to either rap or popular music and their stereotypes regarding Black men were then assessed, both implicitly and explicitly. It was expected that rap music subjects' stereotype IAT scores would be higher, relative to controls.

Explicit stereotypes were also obtained for comparison purposes" (Rudman, Lee). After listening to the explicit and profane music, the subjects completed the IAT test which resulted in the following: "Overall, subjects showed a strong tendency to associate Blacks with negative attributes and Whites with positive attributes. That is, subjects who performed the Black + negative task first were somewhat more likely to show automatic stereotyping, compared with subjects who performed the White + negative task first" (Rudman, Lee). The researchers concluded that, "Thus, exposure to violent and misogynistic rap music had the generalized effect of strengthening the association between Black men and negative attributes (e.g. hostile, criminal, sexist) and decreasing the association between Black men and positive attributes (e.g. calm, trustworthy, polite)" (Rudmand, Lee).

Youth listeners 
According to Gourdine and Lemmons' study, "Perceptions of Misogyny in Hip Hop and Rap: What Do the Youths Think?", the youth population is highly affected and involved in the hip hop and rap music industry. Individuals from ages 18–24 spend a majority of their time listening to this type of music, so researchers Gourdine and Lemmons conducted this study and found that it was easier to understand youth's perceptions on misogyny by focusing on their listening habits and age. When first conducting this research, it was difficult for youth to express their opinions due to the fact that they already had a preconceived notion that adults did not support rap music, "the youths expressed concern that there were different genres of hip hop and rap music and that one needed to understand the history of those artists who fell into what they termed conscious and unconscious categorizations" (Gourdine, 2008).

The youth admitted that, "Even those youths who embrace the lifestyle agree that the media sensationalizes a way of living that can do harm to their communities" (Brown & Gourdine, 1998, 2001, 2007). After conducting a study amongst 262 individuals in an undergraduate college, the researchers revealed that the youth, "who listened to rap and hip hop music less frequently were more likely to have negative perceptions of and attitudes toward the music, and those who listened more frequently were more likely to have positive perceptions and attitudes ... That is, the younger group (18- to 20-year-olds) reported significantly greater scores on the violent-misogyny subscale indicating more positive perceptions and attitudes toward rap and hip hop music than the older group (21- to 23-year-olds)" (Gourdine, 2008).

This study came to the conclusion that the younger the individuals listening to this rap and hip hop music, the more likely they did not identify the misogyny that came with this type of music. According to Gourdine and Lemmons, the older the individuals are, the more likely they are mature and disidentify with the harsh words and misogyny against women in rap music. Gourdine and Lemmons suggest that in order to improve the youth's understanding of rap music we must, "[monitor] the amount of time spent listening to music, which gives youths other alternatives. This study indicates that the younger the youths, the more likely they will listen to rap. This population is college-age, and the maturity factor may have affected the findings in this study. A study looking at younger youths is needed. The opportunity to analyze the music can be useful as well" (Gourdine, 2008).

See also
 C. Delores Tucker, publicly critiqued hip-hop culture 
 Hip hop model
 Sexuality in music videos
 Hip hop culture
 Hip hop feminism
 Homophobia in hip hop culture
 Stereotypes of African Americans

General:
 Hypermasculinity
 Double consciousness
 Sexism in heavy metal music

References
Notes

Bibliography
 
 
 
 
 
 
 
 
 Watkins, Gloria (1992). "Reconstructing Black Masculinity". In: Black Looks: Race and Representation. Boston, MA: South End Press. .
  Pdf.
 Wilson, William J (2009). "The Fragmentation of the Poor Black Family". In: More than just Race: Being Black and Poor in the Inner City. New York: Norton & Company. .

External links
 Generation M: Misogyny in Media & Culture, documentary by Thomas Keith
 Hip Hop: Beyond Beats & Rhymes, documentary by Byron Hurt
 What hip-hop has done to Black women by Johnnetta B. Cole
 Sexism, Hip-Hop and Misogyny at Talk of the Nation
 "The Lesson's Beef with Women": Misogyny in Online Hip-Hop Discourse in Technomusicology: A Sandbox Journal
 "POP VIEW; When Black Feminism Faces The Music, and the Music Is Rap.", by Michele Wallace
 The Problem of Misogyny in Rap Music
 What Does Misogyny Look Like?
 Hip-Hop Misogyny's Effects on Women of Color
 Misogyny vs Sexism
 MC the M is for Misogyny: Does Hip Hop Hate Women? | The Breakdown

African-American gender relations in popular culture
Criticism of hip-hop
Hip hop
hip hop culture
Violence against women
Women in hip hop music
Obscenity controversies in music